The 2014 CWHL Draft was held on August 19, 2014. With the first pick overall, the Brampton Thunder selected Laura Fortino from the Canadian National Women's Team. The defending Clarkson Cup champion Toronto Furies had the second pick overall, and selected Megan Bozek. 2014 Patty Kazmaier Award winner Jamie Lee Rattray was selected in the second round by Brampton. Erica Howe, who played with Rattray with the Clarkson Golden Knights was the first goaltender selected in the draft, 16th overall to Brampton.

Top 25 picks

Draft picks by team

Boston

Brampton

Calgary

Montreal

Toronto

References

Draft
Canadian Women's Hockey League